Shawneetown is a city in Gallatin County, Illinois, United States. The population was 1,239 at the 2010 census, down from 1,410 at the 2000 census. It is the county seat of Gallatin County.

Geography
Illinois Route 13 passes through the city, leading southeast  to the Ohio River and the Kentucky border at Old Shawneetown, and west  to Harrisburg. It is located at the northeast edge of Shawnee National Forest.

History
The present town was established in 1937 after the Ohio River flood of 1937 inundated what is now Old Shawneetown, Illinois.

Demographics

As of the census of 2000, there were 1,410 people, 632 households, and 389 families residing in the city. The racial makeup of the city was 96.17% White, 0.50% African American, 2.34% Native American, 0.14% Pacific Islander, 0.28% from other races, and 0.57% from two or more races. Hispanic or Latino of any race were 1.70% of the population.

There were 632 households, out of which 27.1% had children under the age of 18 living with them, 44.5% were married couples living together, 13.6% had a female householder with no husband present, and 38.4% were non-families. 35.1% of all households were made up of individuals, and 18.7% had someone living alone who was 65 years of age or older. The average household size was 2.20 and the average family size was 2.83.

In the city, the population was spread out, with 21.7% under the age of 18, 9.8% from 18 to 24, 23.3% from 25 to 44, 25.5% from 45 to 64, and 19.8% who were 65 years of age or older.  The median age was 40 years. For every 100 females there were 88.0 males.  For every 100 females age 18 and over, there were 82.5 males.

The median income for a household in the city was $20,789, and the median income for a family was $33,500. Males had a median income of $32,368 versus $20,208 for females. The per capita income for the city was $17,834.  About 20.8% of families and 27.8% of the population were below the poverty line, including 47.2% of those under age 18 and 13.8% of those age 65 or over.

Notable people
 John R. Anderson (minister) (1818–1863), an American minister from St. Louis, Missouri, who fought against slavery and for education for his fellow African Americans.
 Chris Edwards, author, publisher and display artist 
 Henry Rollman, member of the Wisconsin State Assembly and the Wisconsin State Senate
 William W. Wilshire, U.S. Representative from Arkansas (1873-1874, 1875–1877)

References

Further reading
 1887. History of Gallatin, Saline, Hamilton, Franklin and Williamson Counties, Illinois. Chicago: Goodspeed Publishing Co.
 Musgrave, Jon, ed. 2002. Handbook of Old Gallatin County and Southeastern Illinois. Marion, Ill.: IllinoisHistory.com. 464 pages.
 Musgrave, Jon. 2004, Rev. ed. 2005. Slaves, Salt, Sex & Mr. Crenshaw: The Real Story of the Old Slave House and America's Reverse Underground R.R.. Marion, Ill.: IllinoisHistory.com. 608 pages.
 Waggoner, Horace Q., interviewer. 1978. "Lucille Lawler Memoir" Shawneetown Bank Project. Sangamon State University. Springfield, Ill.

External links
 Shawneetown High School
 Shawneetown history

Cities in Gallatin County, Illinois
County seats in Illinois
Populated places established in 1937
1937 establishments in Illinois
Cities in Illinois